Vadātājs (Latvian) – Spirit that misleads people
 Vahana (Hindu) – Divine mounts
 Vaibhavi (Indian) – Deadly snake
 Valkyrie (Norse) – Female spirit that leads souls of dead warriors to Valhalla
 Vâlvă (Romanian) – Female nature spirit
 Valravn (Danish) – Supernatural raven
 Vampire (Slavic) – Reanimated corpse that feeds on blood
 Vanara (Hindu) – Human-ape hybrid
 Vântoase (Romanian) – Female weather spirit
 Varaha (Hindu mythology) – Third Avatar of Vishnu in the form of a boar
 Vârcolac (Romanian) – Vampire or werewolf
 Vardøger (Scandinavian) – Ghostly double
 Vedrfolnir (Norse) – Hawk sitting between the eyes of an eagle in the crown of the World Tree Yggdrasil
 Veļi (Latvian) – Ghost, shade, formed after a death of a human
 Věri Şělen – Chuvash dragon
 Vetala (Hindu) – Corpses possessed by vampiric spirits
 Víbria (Catalan) – Dragon with breasts and an eagle's beak
 Vielfras (German) – Gluttonous dog-cat-fox hybrid
 Vila (Slavic) – Weather spirit
 Vilkacis (Latvian) – Animalistic, werewolf-like monster
 Viruñas (Colombian) – Handsome demon
 Vision Serpent (Mayan) – Mystical dragon
 Víðópnir, (Norse) – Rooster that sits atop the tree
 Vodyanoy (Slavic) – Male water spirit
 Vrykolakas (Greek) – Undead wolf-human hybrid
 Vættir (Norse) – Nature spirit

V